Mi Kwan Lock  is a French actress.

Biography
Lock was born in Mulhouse, France. She is of Chinese desecent and from the age of 10 grew up in Madagascar. She resides in Paris, France.

She plays the female lead in the 2015 film A Korean in Paris directed by Jeon Soo-il which screened at the 20th Busan International Film Festival and at the Palm Springs Film Festival.

She plays the leading female role in several films by director Christian Lara including The Legend featuring Barry Primus and Summer in Provence which screened at the Pan African Film Festival She also appeared in his film Tout est Encore Possible. She has a featured role in Lara’s film Esclave et Courtisane.

Lock has studied with Blanche Salant in Paris, France as well as with Jack Waltzer from the Actors Studio.

Filmography
 A Korean in Paris – Chang (2015)
 Mooncake – La soeur (2014)
 Summer in Provence – Lilly Chang (2012)
 The Legend – Benedicte Coen Schneidre (2012)
 Un Mari Idéal – Carine (2012)

References

External links

French film actresses
Living people
French people of Chinese descent
Year of birth missing (living people)